This article shows the rosters of all participating teams at the 2015 European Games – Women's tournament in Azerbaijan.

Pool A

The following is the Azerbaijani roster in the 2015 European Games.

Head coach: Aleksandr Chervyakov

The following is the Belgian roster in the 2015 European Games.

Head coach: Gert Vande Broek

The following is the Italian roster in the 2015 European Games.

Head coach: Fabio Soli

The following is the Polish roster in the 2015 European Games.

Head coach: Jacek Nawrocki

The following is the Romanian roster in the 2015 European Games.

Head coach: Guillermo Gallardo

The following is the Turkish roster in the 2015 European Games.

Head coach: Ferhat Akbas

Pool B

The following is the Bulgarian roster in the 2015 European Games.

Head coach: Aleksandr Chervyakov

The following is the Croatian roster in the 2015 European Games.

Head coach:  Angelo Vercesi

The following is the German roster in the 2015 European Games.

Head coach:  Luciano Pedullà

The following is the Dutch roster in the 2015 European Games.

Head coach:  Giovanni Guidetti

The following is the Russian roster in the 2015 European Games.

Head coach: Vadim Pankov

The following is the Serbian roster in the 2015 European Games.

Head coach: Zoran Terzić

References

External links
CEV official website

European Games
Women's
European Games volleyball squads
Women's volleyball squads
2015 in women's volleyball